Samuel Adams Sr. (1689–1748) was an American brewer, father of American Founding Father Samuel Adams, and first cousin once removed of John Adams.

Biography
He was born in Boston, on May 16, 1689 to Captain John Adams and Hannah Adams (nee Webb). He was a deacon in the Congregational Church.

He was a Boston Caucus member with Elisha Cooke.
Advertisements from Boston suggest that Adams Sr. owned and sold at least one "Carolina Indian" slave in 1716.

In 1740, he helped create a Land Bank, in Massachusetts Bay Colony, using paper money to promote commerce, with a scarcity of gold and silver coins. In July 1741, the House of Commons passed a bill destroying the land bank, by making shareholders liable for the bank's debts.

Family
In 1713, he married Mary Fifield.
They had twelve children. Three survived into adulthood, including Samuel Adams. Adams Sr. died in 1748.

References

1689 births
1748 deaths
Adams political family
American brewers
American Congregationalists
American people of English descent
American Puritans
Businesspeople from Boston